Dividend is an extinct town in southwest Utah County, Utah, United States. The GNIS classifies it as a populated place.

A post office called Dividend was established in 1922, and remained in operation until 1951. The community was so named in the expectation a nearby mine would pay dividends. By 1922, over one million dollars had been paid in dividends.

See also

 List of ghost towns in Utah

References

External links

Ghost towns in Utah
Geography of Utah County, Utah